Interleukin 17 receptor A, also known as IL17RA and CDw217 (cluster of differentiation w217), is a human gene.

Interleukin 17A (IL17A)is a proinflammatory cytokine secreted by activated T-lymphocytes. It is a potent inducer of the maturation of CD34-positive hematopoietic precursors into neutrophils. The protein encoded by this gene (interleukin 17A receptor; IL17RA) is a ubiquitous type I membrane glycoprotein that binds with low affinity to interleukin 17A. Interleukin 17A and its receptor play a pathogenic role in many inflammatory and autoimmune diseases such as rheumatoid arthritis. Like other cytokine receptors, this receptor likely has a multimeric structure.

See also
 Interleukin-17 receptor

References

Further reading

External links
 

IL17 family cytokine receptors
Clusters of differentiation